"LLYLM" (acronym for "Lie Like You Love Me") is a song by Spanish singer and songwriter Rosalía. It was released as a single on 27 January 2023 through Columbia Records. The flamenco pop song contains handclaps, guitars, synthesizers, and a chorus sung in English. "LLYLM" promoted a limited edition drink made in collaboration between Rosalía and Coca-Cola.

Background and composition
The singer started teasing "LLYLM" in early January 2023, while vacationing in Tokyo with her boyfriend Rauw Alejandro. On 18 January, Rosalía revealed the release date for the song. She kept releasing TikTok clips with snippets of the song leading up to the release. On 23 January, she posted the cover of the single.

"LLYLM" was described as a flamenco pop song with electronic influences. The first verse begins as a tongue twister; "El que quiero, no me quiere / Como quiero que me quiera", with Rosalía singing over a handclap beat. For the chorus, she switches to English while using falsetto and instrumentation provided by guitar and synthesizers; "I don't need honesty / Baby, lie like you love me, lie like you love me".

Promotion
"LLYLM" was used to promote Rosalía's collaboration with Coca-Cola, in which they created a limited edition brand called 'Move'. The drink included a QR code that gives access to behind-the-scenes of the song's creation. A short film inspired by the brand was released on 10 February 2023.

Charts

Certifications

References

2023 singles
2023 songs
Columbia Records singles
Rosalía songs
Songs written by Rosalía